CH Casco Viejo Bilbao was an ice hockey team in Bilbao, Spain. They played in the Superliga Espanola de Hockey Hielo from 1975-1986.

History
CH Casco Viejo Bilbao was founded in 1975 and immediately started playing in the Superliga Espanola de Hockey Hielo, the top league in Spain. They reached the final in their first year, and won the Spanish championship for the first time in 1977. They won the title again in 1978, 1979 and 1981. Before the 1981-82 season the club changed its name to CH Vizcaya Bilbao. It was followed by two more championship titles (1982 and 1983), and a runner-up finish in the Copa del Rey (1982). The club was disbanded in 1986.

Achievements
Spanish champion : 1977, 1978, 1979, 1981, 1982, 1983
Spanish runner-up : 1980
Copa del Rey champion : 1978, 1981
Copa del Rey runner-up : 1976, 1982

External links
Club history

Ice hockey teams in the Basque Country
Sports teams in Bilbao
1975 establishments in Spain
1986 disestablishments in Spain
Ice hockey clubs established in 1975
Ice hockey clubs disestablished in 1986
Defunct ice hockey teams in Europe